The Seaside Heights School District is a community public school district for students in kindergarten through sixth grade from Seaside Heights, in Ocean County, New Jersey, United States. The district's Board of Education is made up of five members, each elected to three-year terms.

As of the 2020–21 school year, the district, comprised of one school, had an enrollment of 222 students and 24.5 classroom teachers (on an FTE basis), for a student–teacher ratio of 9.1:1.

The district is classified by the New Jersey Department of Education as being in District Factor Group "A", the lowest of eight groupings. District Factor Groups organize districts statewide to allow comparison by common socioeconomic characteristics of the local districts. From lowest socioeconomic status to highest, the categories are A, B, CD, DE, FG, GH, I and J.

Public school students in seventh through twelfth grades attend the schools of the Central Regional School District, which also serves students from the municipalities of Berkeley Township, Island Heights, Ocean Gate and Seaside Park. Schools in the district (with 2020–21 enrollment data from the National Center for Education Statistics) are 
Central Regional Middle School with 842 students in grades 7 and 8 and 
Central Regional High School with 1,568 students in grades 9 - 12. The high school district's board of education is comprised of nine members, who are directly elected by the residents of the constituent municipalities to three-year terms of office on a staggered basis, with three seats up for election each year. Seaside Heights is allocated one of the board's nine seats.

History
The original school facility, Seaside Heights Elementary School, was built in 1926 and later demolished after the opening of a larger school building on the bay front. The current school was built in the late 1960s, and is dedicated to Hugh J. Boyd Jr., its longtime Superintendent of Schools who died in 1983. The district's Early Childhood Center addition was dedicated in 2007 in the name of longtime Board of Education Member Harry M. Smith III.

From 2003-2012, the Toms River Regional Schools provided administrative, maintenance, food and other services to the Seaside Heights Board of Education. The Seaside Heights district had been overseen by Toms River central administration until April 2012 when the board elected to align with Central Regional superintendent Triantafillos Parlapanides.

School
Hugh J. Boyd Jr. Elementary School served 233 students as of the 2020–21 school year. The school was built in 1967, and is dedicated to Hugh J. Boyd Jr., its late, longtime Superintendent of Schools. Its addition built in 2005 is dedicated in the name of longtime Board of Education member Harry M. Smith III. 
Chris Raichle, Principal

Administration
Core members of the district's administration are:
Triantafillos Parlapanides, Superintendent of Schools
Kevin O'Shea, Business Administrator / Board Secretary

Board of education
The district's board of education, comprised of five members, sets policy and oversees the fiscal and educational operation of the district through its administration. As a Type II school district, the board's trustees are elected directly by voters to serve three-year terms of office on a staggered basis, with either one or two seats up for election each year held (since 2012) as part of the November general election. The board appoints a superintendent to oversee the district's day-to-day operations and a business administrator to supervise the business functions of the district.

References

External links
Seaside Heights School District
 
School Data for the Seaside Heights Public School, National Center for Education Statistics
Central Regional School District

Seaside Heights, New Jersey
New Jersey District Factor Group A
School districts in Ocean County, New Jersey
Public elementary schools in New Jersey